was a castle structure in Kurume, Japan. Kurume Castle was built by the ninth son of Mōri Motonari, Kobayakawa Hidekane in 1587.

Kurume castle is now only ruins, with some stone walls and water moat. The castle was listed as one of the Continued Top 100 Japanese Castles in 2017.

Gallery

Literature

References

Castles in Fukuoka Prefecture
Historic Sites of Japan
Former castles in Japan
Ruined castles in Japan